Bernie Kelly may refer to:

Mike Kelly (baseball, born 1896) (1896–1968), also known as Bernie Kelly, American baseball coach and manager
Bernie Kelly (footballer) (1932–2004), Scottish footballer
Bernie Kelly, character in Fair City
Bernie Kelly (Redwater), character in Redwater

See also
 Bernard Kelly (disambiguation)